William Scott Miller (born May 31, 1967) is an American Major League Baseball umpire who began his career in the American League in . Miller wears number 26. He has been a crew chief since the 2014 season.

Early life
Miller graduated from UCLA with a history degree in 1989. He umpired in the Northwest League, Arizona Instructional League, South Atlantic League, California League, Texas League, International League, and Pacific Coast League before reaching the MLB in 1997. While umpiring in the International League, Miller was robbed at gunpoint at a hotel.

MLB career
Miller has officiated in six Wild Card Games (2012, 2014, 2015, 2018, 2019, 2020), ten Division Series (2002, 2003, 2005, 2008, 2010, 2013, 2016, 2017, 2020, 2022), eight League Championship Series (2009, 2011, 2012, 2014, 2015, 2018, 2019, 2021), and four World Series (2010, 2013, 2017, 2020). He also officiated the 2007 and 2022 All-Star Games and twice in the World Baseball Classic (2009, 2013).

On May 15, 2012, Miller was involved in an altercation with Toronto Blue Jays third baseman Brett Lawrie during his last at-bat. With a 3–1 count, pitcher Fernando Rodney threw two balls, based on replays and computerized strike zone analysis. Lawrie headed toward first after each pitch, but Miller called the pitches strikes and ejected Lawrie after he protested the strikeout. Lawrie then threw his helmet, which bounced off the ground and hit Miller. The next day, Major League Baseball suspended Lawrie for four games.

Miller was chosen as one of the umpires for the one-game Wild Card playoff between the Baltimore Orioles and the Texas Rangers on October 5, 2012.

Before the 2014 season, he was named a crew chief by Major League Baseball.

Miller was the home plate umpire for Miami Marlins pitcher Edinson Vólquez's no-hitter against the Arizona Diamondbacks on June 3, 2017. In 2019, he was named President of the Major League Baseball Umpires Association, succeeding Joe West.

Personal life
Miller graduated from University of California, Los Angeles in 1989, and resides in Incline Village, Nevada. He was a three-sport athlete at Harbor High School in Santa Cruz, California, and was Athlete of the Year in Santa Cruz County his senior year. He is an alumnus of the Sigma Chi fraternity.

See also

 List of Major League Baseball umpires

References

External links

Major league profile
Retrosheet

1967 births
Living people
Sportspeople from Vallejo, California
Major League Baseball umpires
People from Incline Village, Nevada
University of California, Los Angeles alumni